Aberásturi is a hamlet and concejo located in the municipality of Vitoria-Gasteiz, in Álava province, Basque Country, Spain.

History
After the Cuadrilla de Añana separated from the Cuadrilla de Vitoria in 1840, Aberásturi remained within Vitoria. The village had previously belonged to the now extinct municipality of Elorriaga, which was absorbed by the municipality of Vitoria around 1870.

Demographics

In 1960, Aberásturi had a population of 242. This figured halved by 2000, and has remained stable since then.

Heritage
The Catholic parish church is under the patronage of Saint Stephen. It has a neoclassical portico designed by Justo Antonio de Olaguibel, built during the early nineteenth century. The rest of the building dates from the late fifteenth or early sixteenth century.

References

External links
 

Concejos in Vitoria-Gasteiz